The Group of Western European and Other States, also known as the Western European and Other States Group or WEOG, is one of the five United Nations regional groups and is composed of 28 Member States mainly from Western Europe, but also from Oceania, Northern America, and Western Asia.

The Group is a non-binding dialogue group where subjects concerning regional and international matters are discussed. Additionally, the Group works to help allocate seats on United Nations bodies by nominating candidates from the region.

Unlike most other Regional Groups, WEOG is unusual in that geography is not the sole defining factor of its membership. Instead, its membership is based on geopolitical breakdown, being part of the "Western world" of affluent, developed liberal democracies, and are either part of Western Europe or one of its former settler colonies, and part of the NATO military alliance and/or the US-led western military-economic community.

Membership

Member states 
The following are the current Member States of the Western European and Others Group:

Observer states 

 The United States of America is not formally a member of any regional group, but attends meetings of WEOG as an observer and is considered to be a member of the group for electoral purposes.

Israel 
While geographically located in Asia, Israel has been blocked from joining the Asia-Pacific Group by various Arab states. Since the regional groupings were created in the early 1960s, Israel had been unable to participate in the political and professional consultations within the framework of the United Nations and its agencies. It was also unable to have its representatives elected to United Nations institutions due to the fact that it was not part of any regional group.

This changed in May 2000, when Israel became a temporary member of the WEOG at the United Nations in New York, allowing it to put forward candidates for election to various United Nations General Assembly bodies. However, this temporary membership still precluded Israel from participating in activities at United Nations offices in Geneva, Nairobi, Rome and Vienna.

On 30 April 2004, the United States House of Representatives passed a resolution calling for the full inclusion of Israel in WEOG, directing the U.S. Government to pursue action to "ensure the extension and upgrade of Israel's membership in the Western European and Others Group at the United Nations." This was accomplished in May 2004, when Israel was granted a permanent renewal for WOEG proceedings in New York.

However, it wasn't until November 2013 when Israel was finally admitted into WEOG proceedings at the United Nations Geneva Office, 1 January 2014.

Suggested reform 
In his address before the General Assembly at the 55th General Debate, Vinci Niel Clodumar, the head of the Nauru Delegation, advocated for the creation of a new Oceania regional group to include both Australia and New Zealand, as well as the ASEAN member countries, Japan, the Republic of Korea and the Pacific island countries. In his speech he mentioned that "the 11 Pacific island countries are drowning in the Asian Group, while Australia and New Zealand...are marooned in the Group of Western European and other States."

Representation

Security Council 
The Western European and Other States Group holds 5 seats on the Security Council, 2 non-permanent and 3 permanent. The current members of the Security Council from the Group are:

Economic and Social Council 
The Western European and Other States Group holds 13 seats on the United Nations Economic and Social Council. The current members of the Economic and Social Council from the Group are:

Human Rights Council 
The Western European and Other States Group holds 7 seats on the United Nations Human Rights Council. The current members of the Economic and Social Council from the Group are:

Presidency of the General Assembly 
Every five years in the years ending in 0 and 5, the Western European and Other States Group is eligible to elect a president to the General Assembly.

The following is a list of presidents from the region since its official creation in 1961:

Timeline of membership 
As the Western European Group changed significantly over time, the number of its members had also changed.

See also
 United Nations Regional Groups
 Israel and the United Nations
 List of members of the United Nations Security Council
 List of members of the United Nations Economic and Social Council
 JUSCANZ

References

Notes 

United Nations coalitions and unofficial groups